WOW – Women of Wrestling, is an American women's professional wrestling promotion founded in 2000 by David McLane (who also founded Gorgeous Ladies of Wrestling (GLOW)). WOW is based in Los Angeles, California, and is owned by McLane and Los Angeles Lakers owner/president Jeanie Buss.

Initially broadcasting in syndication during in the 2000–01 television season, WOW is a sports entertainment-styled product where its talent portrays heavily dramatized characters.

History 

WOW has been recognized as one of the few nationally broadcast wrestling promotions featuring an all-female roster. Only 24 television episodes and a pay-per-view event were produced during its initial run. In 2002, McLane sought a partnership with Kiss frontman Gene Simmons to revive the promotion. In July 2011, WOW TV reruns began airing on the ABC affiliate KTNV in Las Vegas.

On May 29, 2012, McLane and Buss announced their intention to revive WOW and produce new episodes. Later that year, WOW reruns began airing on The CW Las Vegas station KVCW starting on December 9.

In December 2014, WOW announced that it would be producing content for digital media in 2015. Marketed as "WOW Superheroes", its roster of characters are portrayed as empowered women from all different backgrounds and professions. A second season premiered on March 1, 2016, on YouTube. Its fourth season premiered February 28, 2017.

On April 20, 2017, MGM Television announced that Mark Burnett, MGM's President, Television Group & Digital, and Jeanie Buss formed a partnership to develop new WOW content across a range of unscripted programming and digital formats. In June 2018, it was announced that tapings for a new weekly program on AXS TV titled WOW: Women of Wrestling would begin on October 10, 2018 at the Belasco Theater in Los Angeles, with episodes airing in early 2019. WOW debuted that January 18 as part of AXS TV's "Friday Night Fights" lineup of shows. The AXS TV premiere marked WOW's first television broadcast of new content in almost eighteen years. WOW: Women of Wrestling ran for two seasons on AXS TV. In June 2020, it was reported that AXS had cancelled the series.

On October 6, 2021, it was announced that ViacomCBS (now Paramount Global) had entered into a multi-year distribution agreement for WOW that will see new episodes produced for weekend syndication on 160 U.S. TV stations (CBS or The CW affiliates) owned by ViacomCBS or Sinclair Broadcast Group, with new episodes airing starting in Fall 2022. On October 7, WOW announced that April Mendez (fka AJ Lee in WWE) joined the company as an executive producer and color commentator.

On January 21, 2022, WOW announced in a press release that "never-before-seen" episodes from "season 7" would debut on Pluto TV and The CW app starting January 22. On August 1, 2022, it was announced that new episodes of the series will begin airing on September 17, 2022, via Paramount Global Content Distribution. The series is carried in the U.S. on CBS-owned-and-operated stations, Sinclair Communications, Nexstar Broadcasting, Hearst Television, TEGNA Media, Weigel Broadcasting, Gray Media and Cox Television. It has also been licensed for broadcast in Canada, Australia and Indonesia.

Seasons

WOW Unleashed 

WOW Unleashed was a professional wrestling pay-per-view from Women of Wrestling. It took place on February 4, 2001, from the Great Western Forum in Inglewood, California. The PPV suffered from technical difficulties and a low buyrate. A second PPV, Spring Vengeance, was announced for April 8, 2001, during Unleashed, but never came to fruition. The announcers were Lee Marshall and former manager Bobby "The Brain" Heenan. Regular announcer David McLane, also the promotion's President, served as Master of Ceremonies.
Event results

Personnel

Championships

References

External links

Google Groups archive of press release announcing WOW

Divas of Pro-Wrestling
Women Wrestling

Independent professional wrestling promotions based in California
2000 American television series debuts
Women's professional wrestling promotions
2000 establishments in the United States
American professional wrestling television series
Professional wrestling in the Las Vegas Valley